Richard Clitheroe (died c. 1463), of New Romney, Kent, was an English politician.

Clitheroe was the son of William Clitheroe, also an MP for New Romney, and the nephew of Richard Clitheroe, MP for Kent.

He was a Member (MP) of the Parliament of England for New Romney in April 1414,
1415, March 1416, 1419, 1420, May 1421, 1422, 1423, 1429, 1435, 1437, 1442, 1445 and 1447. He was also jurat and (possibly deputy) bailiff of Romney and was the Cinque Ports’ bailiff at Yarmouth. He may have served as coroner of Kent.

References

Year of birth missing
1460s deaths
English MPs April 1414
English MPs 1415
English MPs March 1416
English MPs 1419
English MPs 1420
English MPs May 1421
English MPs 1422
English MPs 1423
English MPs 1429
English MPs 1435
English MPs 1437
English MPs 1442
English MPs 1445
English MPs 1447
15th-century English politicians
Members of Parliament for New Romney
Bailiffs
English coroners
Jurats